Ernst Jakob Henne ( –  ) was a German motorcycle racer and racecar driver.

Henne was born in the village of Weiler, near Wangen im Allgäu. His father was a saddlemaker. In 1919 Henne was apprenticed to a become a motor vehicle mechanic. He started racing in 1923 in Mühldorf, finishing third on a Megola in his first race. In 1925 he competed in the Monza Grand Prix, his first major international event, where he placed sixth in the 350cc class.

Henne soon became one of the most successful German motorcycle racers. After joining the BMW works team, he became the 1926 German champion in the 500cc class, 1927 German champion in the 750cc class and the 1928 winner of the Targa Florio.

This record stood for 14 years.

Henne competed in the International Six Days Trial, and was a member of the winning German teams of 1933, 1934, and 1935. He also raced sports cars, winning the two-litre class of the 1936 Eifelrennen in the first appearance of the BMW 328.

Having earned his pilot's licence in 1932, Henne was conscripted by the Luftwaffe during World War II, but was declared unfit due to the skull fractures and concussions he had suffered during his racing career. After the war, he developed a contract workshop with Mercedes-Benz. In 1991 he founded the Ernst-Jakob-Henne Foundation to help innocent victims of misfortune.

From 1996 until his death in 2005 at the age of 101, Henne lived in retirement with his wife on the Canary Islands.

See also
List of motorcycles of the 1920s

References

People from Lindau (district)
Sportspeople from Swabia (Bavaria)
1904 births
2005 deaths
German motorcycle racers
Enduro riders
German centenarians
Men centenarians
Motorcycle land speed record people
Commanders Crosses of the Order of Merit of the Federal Republic of Germany
World record setters in motorcycling
Luftwaffe personnel of World War II